Kings of Beer is the ninth studio album by German thrash metal band Tankard, released on 28 April 2000. It is their first album with guitarist Andy Gutjahr. The album was re-released by AFM Records in 2007 with a cover version of Metallica's "Damage, Inc.".

Track listing

Personnel
 Andreas "Gerre" Geremia - vocals
 Frank Thorwarth - bass
 Andy Gutjahr - guitar
 Olaf Zissel - drums

References 

2000 albums
Tankard (band) albums
Century Media Records albums
Albums produced by Harris Johns